Muthu Irulandi Mayakannan (born 4 June 1997) is an Indian footballer who plays as a defensive midfielder for Sreenidi Deccan in the I-League.

Career

Gokulam Kerala
On 6 August 2019, Mayakannan was promoted from the Gokulam Kerala Reserves to senior team for their Durand Cup squad by head coach Fernando Varela. On 18 August 2019, he made his debut for the club in the competition, against TRAU, in a 4–1 win.

On 6 December 2019, he made his I-League debut for the club against Indian Arrows, in a narrow 1–0 win, coming on for Haroon Amiri in the 72nd minute.

Sreenidi Deccan
On 30 June 2021, Mayakkannan joined Sreenidi Deccan, reuniting with his former head coach Fernando Varela.

On 27 December 2021, he made his debut for the club against NEROCA, in a 3–2 loss.

Career statistics

Club

Honours

Club
Gokulam Kerala FC
 Durand Cup: 2019
 Kerala Premier League: 2018
 I-League: 2020–21

References

Living people
Indian footballers
Association football midfielders
Gokulam Kerala FC players
1997 births
People from Ramanathapuram district
Footballers from Tamil Nadu
I-League players
Sreenidi Deccan FC players